A statue of Margaret Thatcher, the first female prime minister of the United Kingdom, stands in the Members' Lobby of the Houses of Parliament in London. It is a bronze sculpture of Margaret Thatcher, the first female Prime Minister of the United Kingdom. It was commissioned in 2003 following a change in rules to allow the depiction of living prime ministers in Parliament under certain conditions. The bronze statue, sculpted by Antony Dufort, was unveiled on 21 February 2007 by Michael Martin, Speaker of the House of Commons, with Thatcher in attendance.

Description
The design of the statue is intended to show Margaret Thatcher during her final term as prime minister, between 1987 and 1990. It stands directly opposite the statue of Sir Winston Churchill and the doors to the chamber of the House of Commons. Thatcher is depicted pointing with her right arm outstretched and holding a sheaf of papers in her left hand, posed as if addressing the House. It cost around £80,000, and weighs .

History

Historical rules prevented the erection of a statue in the Houses of Parliament of any living parliamentarian.

However, in 2002, these rules were changed to allow for a statue or bust to be displayed of a former Prime Minister once five years have passed after their death, or when three Parliaments have elapsed after their resignation from the post. The second criterion is on the proviso that at least twelve years have passed and that they are no longer a sitting MP. Following these rule changes, busts of former Prime Ministers Lord Callaghan and Sir Edward Heath were installed in the Members' Lobby in 2002. A statue of Margaret Thatcher was commissioned in 2003 from Antony Dufort by the Advisory Committee on the Works of Art with the intention of installing it in the Members' Lobby, adding to the numerous busts and three full-size bronze statues.

The statue was unveiled in the Members' Lobby on 21 February 2007 by the Speaker of the House of Commons, Rt Hon. Michael Martin MP. During a speech at the unveiling, Baroness Thatcher, nicknamed "The Iron Lady" during her tenure as Prime Minister, said, "I might have preferred iron, but bronze will do. It won't rust. And, this time I hope, the head will stay on." The beheading comment was in reference to a previous statue of Thatcher, originally intended for the Palace of Westminster, which was vandalised through decapitation whilst on loan to London's Guildhall Art Gallery.

After its erection, the statue was compared unfavourably with other statues due to its height as it is only around  taller than Baroness Thatcher in real life. Once installed, the statue of Thatcher left only three former Prime Ministers missing from being represented in the Members Lobby: Sir Henry Campbell-Bannerman, Bonar Law and Neville Chamberlain.

The statue's arrival was not welcomed by all MPs; the Labour MP Stephen Hepburn called for the removal of the statue only a week after it was installed. He gained the support of three other MPs, including Glenda Jackson.

In 2013, MPs were warned not to touch the statue's toes for good luck as it was damaging it.

See also 
 Statue of Margaret Thatcher (Grantham)
 Statue of Margaret Thatcher (London Guildhall)

References

External links
 

2007 sculptures
2007 establishments in England
Bronze sculptures in the United Kingdom
Monuments and memorials in London
Monuments and memorials to women
Palace of Westminster
Thatcher, Margaret
Thatcher
Westminster